Bella Donna was a 1915 American silent drama film produced by Famous Players-Lasky and the Charles Frohman Company, starring Pauline Frederick, and based on the 1912 play Bella Donna by James Bernard Fagan adapted from the 1909 novel of the same name by Robert Smythe Hichens.

In 1912, Alla Nazimova starred in a Broadway stage version which ran for 72 performances. A second version of the novel and play was filmed in 1923 starring Pola Negri.

Plot

Cast
Pauline Frederick as Bella Donna
Thomas Holding as Nigel Armine
Julian L'Estrange as Baroudi
Eugene Ormonde as Doctor Isaacson
George Majeroni as Ibraham
Edmund Shalet as Hamza
Helen Sinnott as The Maid
Betty Blythe as a dancer (uncredited)

Preservation status
The 1915 version is now considered to be a lost film.

See also
List of lost films

References

External links

Bella Donna at silentera.com

1915 films
1915 drama films
1910s English-language films
Silent American drama films
American silent feature films
American black-and-white films
Famous Players-Lasky films
Films based on British novels
American films based on plays
Films directed by Edwin S. Porter
Films directed by Hugh Ford
Lost American films
Paramount Pictures films
Films based on adaptations
1915 lost films
Lost drama films
1910s American films